Meristomerinx is a genus of flies in the family Stratiomyidae.

Species
Meristomerinx camerunensis Enderlein, 1914
Meristomerinx tabaniformis (Lindner, 1952)

References

Stratiomyidae
Brachycera genera
Taxa named by Günther Enderlein
Diptera of Africa